The Gouina Hydroelectric Plant is a run-of-the-river-type hydroelectric installation currently being constructed on Gouina Falls along the Senegal River in Mali. It is the fourth project of the Senegal River Basin Development Authority and its ground-breaking ceremony on 17 December 2013 was attended by the heads of state of each member country. Mauritanian President Mohamed Ould Abdel Aziz laid the foundation stone. Preliminary construction had been suspended due to the 2012 Malian coup d'état and subsequent Northern Mali conflict. The plant is expected to be complete in 2020 and will provide power to Mauritania, Mali and Senegal. The project is receiving 85 percent of its funding from the Exim Bank of China along with US$1 million from the EU-Africa Infrastructure Trust Fund and US$1.4 million from the International Development Association and European Investment Bank.

The power house will contain three 46.6 MW Kaplan turbine-generators.

See also

Manantali Dam – upstream
Félou Hydroelectric Plant – downstream
Diama Dam – downstream

References

Dams in Mali
Weirs
Dams on the Senegal River
Dams under construction
Run-of-the-river power stations
Hydroelectric power stations in Mali
Kayes Region
Mali–Senegal relations
Mauritania–Senegal relations
Mali–Mauritania relations